Nature parks in Germany have been established under section 22, paragraph 4 of that country's Federal Nature Conservation Act (BNatSchG).  there were 103 nature parks, comprising about 27 percent of the total land area of Germany and are brought together under the Association of German Nature Parks. In total there are 23,159 Protected Areas in Germany.

Parks that overlap into neighbouring countries are led by Europarc.

The surface area of nature parks in Germany increased by 42% between 1998 and the end of 2019 (this corresponds to around 3.0 million hectares).

The 16 national parks of Germany, under paragraph 24 of the Federal Nature Conservation Act, are not listed here. See List of national parks of Germany.



Nature parks

See also 
 Natural National Landscapes
 Bund für Umwelt und Naturschutz Deutschland
 Nature parks in Switzerland

References

Further reading
 Karl-Heinz Bochow, Klaus Bötig, et al.: Der große ADAC-Freizeitführer – Die letzten Paradiese – Unsere schönsten Natur- und Nationalparks in Deutschland. ADAC Verlag GmbH, München und Verlag Das Beste GmbH, Stuttgart, 1995. .

External links
 Naturparke Deutschland
 Bundesamt für Naturschutz, especially Grenzen der Naturparke